Havrysh Stepan Bohdanovych (born 2 January 1952) is a Ukrainian politician, Doctor of Law (1994), Professor  of the National Law Academy named after Yaroslav the Wise (1996), Academician of the National Academy of Legal Sciences of Ukraine (2004), Honoured Lawyer of Ukraine (2003); People's Deputy of Ukraine III and IV convocations.

Activities in the Verkhovna Rada 
In 1998, he was elected People's Deputy of Ukraine for Chuhuiv Electoral District No. 176 (40% of voters' votes, 18 applicants). Leader of the deputy group "Revival of the Regions".

2000–2002 — Deputy Chairman of the Verkhovna Rada of Ukraine;

He served as the Head of the Temporary Special Commission for the preparation and preliminary consideration of draft laws on amendments to the Constitution of Ukraine based on the results of the All-Ukrainian referendum on people's initiative (2001).

In 2002, he was elected a People's Deputy of Ukraine for the Chuhuiv Electoral District No. 177 (64% of votes, 4 candidates).

He was a coordinator of the permanent parliamentary majority in the Verkhovna Rada of Ukraine, leader of the deputy group "Democratic Initiatives", member of the committee of the Verkhovna Rada of Ukraine on the fuel and energy complex, nuclear policy and nuclear safety.

He was a co-chairman of the Temporary Special Commission of the Verkhovna Rada of Ukraine on drafting draft laws of Ukraine on amendments to the Constitution of Ukraine (2002).

In 2004-2010, Havrysh was a member of the Supreme Council of Justice.

Reference 

1952 births
Living people
Yaroslav Mudryi National Law University alumni
Third convocation members of the Verkhovna Rada
Fourth convocation members of the Verkhovna Rada
Deputy chairmen of the Verkhovna Rada
Recipients of the Honorary Diploma of the Cabinet of Ministers of Ukraine
Recipients of the Order of Merit (Ukraine), 3rd class
Recipients of the Order of Merit (Ukraine), 2nd class
Recipients of the Order of Merit (Ukraine), 1st class